Audley Sinclair Gillespie-Jones (1 July 1914 – 7 May 2000) was an Australian rules footballer who played for the Melbourne Football Club and Fitzroy Football Club in the Victorian Football League (VFL).

He practised as a barrister at the Victorian Bar. He also worked as a football writer for The Argus.

He wrote a series of books of legal anecdotes:
 The Lawyer Who Laughed
 The Lawyer Who Laughed Again
 The Lawyer Who Laughed Longer.

Notes

External links 

1914 births
2000 deaths
Australian rules footballers from Victoria (Australia)
Melbourne Football Club players
Fitzroy Football Club players
Old Melburnians Football Club players
Australian barristers
Writers from Melbourne
Australian sportswriters